The 2019–20 EHF Champions League group stage began on 11 September 2019 and was concluded on 1 March 2020. A total of 28 teams competed for 14 places in the knockout stage of the 2019–20 EHF Champions League.

Draw
The draw for the group stage was held on 27 June 2019.

Seedings
The seedings were announced on 20 June 2018.

Format
In each group, teams played against each other in a double round-robin format, with home and away matches. After completion of the group stage matches, the teams advancing to the knockout stage was determined in the following manner:

Groups A and B – the top teams qualified directly for the quarter-finals, and the five teams ranked 2nd–6th advanced to the first knockout round.
Groups C and D – the top two teams from both groups contested a playoff to determine the last two sides joining the ten teams from Groups A and B in the first knockout round.

Tiebreakers
In the group stage, teams are ranked according to points (2 points for a win, 1 point for a draw, 0 points for a loss). After completion of the group stage, if two or more teams have the same number of points, the ranking is determined as follows:

Highest number of points in matches between the teams directly involved;
Superior goal difference in matches between the teams directly involved;
Highest number of goals scored in matches between the teams directly involved (or in the away match in case of a two-team tie);
Superior goal difference in all matches of the group;
Highest number of plus goals in all matches of the group;
If the ranking of one of these teams is determined, the above criteria are consecutively followed until the ranking of all teams is determined. If no ranking can be determined, a decision shall be obtained by EHF through drawing of lots.

Groups
The matchdays were 11–15 September, 18–22 September, 25–29 September, 9–13 October, 16–20 October, 30 October–3 November, 6–10 November, 13–17 November, 20–24 November, 27 November–1 December 2019. For Groups A and B, additional matchdays included, 5–9 February, 12–16 February, 19–23 February and 26 February–1 March 2020.

Group A

Group B

Group C

Group D

Playoffs

Matches

Dinamo București won 52–49 on aggregate.

Orlen Wisła Płock won 51–49 on aggregate.

References

External links
Official website

Group stage